Massimilian Breeder (born in Genova, June 13, 1978) is an Italian artist who works in film, drawings, sound and installation. He spent his childhood with his grandparents between Genova, Italy and Polperro, England. In 1992 he returned to Italy to study at the Paul Klee Institute for the Arts, followed by Neuroscience Studies at the University of Florence, where he began working on neural networks and biofeedbacks research, while developing interests in films and sculptural installations. He presented the first model of interaction between Cinema and Neuroscience at the prestigious Hôpital de la Salpêtrière in Paris, implementing the use of biofeedback technology to modulate and change the course of the narrative structure of a film. The project was titled Amigdalae and its development characterized Mr. Breeder's fascination with moving pictures.
In 2002, he graduated with a degree in Experimental Psychology and began Cinema Studies at the National School of Cinema in Milan, which he would later abandon to move to New York City and work on his film projects * .
Massimilian Breeder currently lives and works in USA and Europe.

Works

In 1998 Mr. Breeder began working on film, sound and installation under the form of ongoing projects like Wurlitzer Repetition (Ignite Arts Center, Los Angeles 2007).  His collaborations with Nina Breeder *  on New Reproductive Systems, films and installations received attention from The Pompidou Museum (Paris, France), Anthology Film Archive (NYC) and Guggenheim Museum (NYC). In 2008-09 his film Devil Come to Hell and Stay Where You Belong (2008)*  obtained international interest and gave birth to a series of film works on the American Landscape. In his work Mr. Breeder explores elements of nature, employing narrative models from other domains, such as biology, geology, politics, characterized by concepts like restraint, fluids under pressure, violence and sexuality . 
In 2009, while working on a public installation "Crude Oil" in the Arabic neighborhood Darom - Tel Aviv, Mr.Breeder developed an interest in the Middle East and its endangered cultures and confines. During his extended stay in territories afflicted and transformed by ongoing conflicts, he wrote the film Reservoir, completed in late 2013. RESERVOIR*

Selected works and exhibitions
2021

 The Lunatic Express - Writer and Director - Film (120m, Color to Premiere in Paris, France November 16th 2021) in collaboration with Solweig Rediger-Lizlow

 Resonance - Brainwaves and binaural-beats research project on the effects of sound on sleep stages - RESONANCE

 The Living Thing - Documentaries and Vlogs - TheLivingThing

2020

 RI'ZISTENS: Music Project - in collaboration with Solweig Rediger-Lizlow

2014
Fukushima Best-Girl: Writer and Director - currently in post-production

2013

Reservoir: Writer and Director - Cicala Filmworks, NoCrew - IFC, ECT Commission 
The Car Crashes: Institute of Contemporary Arts Singapore exhibition Theo.do.lites - curated by Kent Chan & Silke Schmickl -  

2012

The Car Crashes: 9 Films -  
Arte Channel: The Palms -  

2011

Animal Kingdom: Schinkel Pavillon curated by April Lamm -  
Fukushima Best-Girl: Writer and Director - 2011 Japan, Film - 
Kinbaku:  New York City, USA * 

2010

Winter Films: 2010 USA, Film - Appeared in Human Frames 2011 

2009

Devil come to Hell and stay where You Belong: Pera Museum, Istanbul, Turkey
Devil come to Hell and stay where you belong:  Centre Georges Pompidou in Paris and Metz, France*  
Freeshout and Pecci Museum, Prato, Italy* Freeshout
Anthology Film Archives, New York City* Anthology Film Archive

2008

Love is a Burning thing: Full Scale Architectonic Installation, Darom Art Center, Tel Aviv (Crude Oil, Stone, 300x100) 
Artoteca, Milan, Italy
Copenhagen International Film Festival, Official Selection* IMDB 
Gothenburg International Film Festival, Official Selection

2007

The Lunch, Installation and Performance in collaboration with Nina Breeder at Art Space Blanque Monteaux, Paris
"Wurlitzer Repetitions" Ignite Art Center (Lauren Bon), Los Angeles* 
Artist in residence at Cite' Culture at the Maison Internationalle de Paris, France
"Naked", Triple Video Projection - Chelsea Museum 
"Untitledx" Life Size Installation - Saatchi Art London 

2006

Amigdalae - Art Basel, Miami
Amigdalae - Hôpital de la Salpêtrière, Paris
Boreas Gallery, Scott Laugenour, Brooklyn, New York

2005

Video installation at Ex-Macelli Freeshout with Sislej Xhafa

References
Experimental Cinema* LoWave
Museum of Modern and Contemporary Art* Pompidou Museum 
Centre Georges Pompidou* Hors Pistes
Anthology Film Archive, New York City* Anthology Film Archive
The MainPOint* The Main Point
Entrisme Contemporary Art Magazine* Entrisme
Freeshout* Freeshout
Internet Movies Database* IMDB
Wurlitzer Repetitions *

External links
NoCrew
LoWave Experimental Film Label
Centre George Pompidou 

Artists from Genoa
Artists from New York City
Italian film directors
Living people
1978 births
University of Florence alumni
Film people from Genoa